Lee C. Fine Memorial Airport  a public airport located in Lake of the Ozarks State Park in Kaiser, Missouri, United States. The airport is owned by the city of Osage Beach.

Facilities 

 Runway 4/22: 6,497 x 100 ft (1,980 x 30 m), surface: asphalt

Historical airline service

 Ozark Airlines DC-9 and Skyway Airlines Beech 99, Beech 18 and DC-3 service

References

External links 

Airports in Missouri
Lake of the Ozarks
Buildings and structures in Miller County, Missouri